Lockhart Creek Provincial Park is a provincial park in British Columbia, Canada, located adjacent to Lockhart Beach Provincial Park, 40 km north of Creston, British Columbia on the east shore of Kootenay Lake.

History
The park was established 1995.

Conservation
The park aims to protect an old-growth cedar-hemlock forest, as well as a wide variety of fish and bird life. The park encompasses one of the few /valleys in the region without roads and protects a diverse old growth forest.

Recreation
The following recreational activities are available: backcountry camping, hiking, fishing (in season), and hunting (in season). Multi-day backpackers can access Kianuko Provincial Park from Lockhart Creek.

Location
Located 40 kilometres north of Creston, British Columbia on the east side of Kootenay Lake.

Size
3,734 hectares in size.

External links
Lockhart Creek Provincial Park

Provincial parks of British Columbia
Regional District of Central Kootenay
West Kootenay
1995 establishments in British Columbia
Protected areas established in 1995